Melvyn Lorenzen (born 26 November 1994) is a Ugandan professional footballer who plays as a winger for Wormatia Worms. He also holds German citizenship.

Club career

Werder Bremen
Lorenzen joined SV Werder Bremen in 2013 from Holstein Kiel. He made his Bundesliga debut on 5 October 2013 against VfB Stuttgart. He replaced Eljero Elia after 88 minutes in a 1–1 draw in Stuttgart.

On 13 December 2014, Lorenzen played his first Bundesliga match as part of the starting lineup and scored in a 3–3 draw against Hannover. On 28 January 2015, Lorenzen sustained an injury to the meniscus of his right knee and underwent surgery two days later.

Lorenzen had his first appearance of the 2015–16 season in Werder's 1–0 home defeat to Bayern Munich on 17 October 2015 before being substituted after 59 minutes.

He was released by Werder Bremen after playing for the reserves in the 2016–17 season. In his time at the club, he made a total of 14 Bundesliga appearances scoring one goal.

ADO Den Haag
In late July 2017, Lorenzen joined Eredivisie side ADO Den Haag on a two-year contract. He made his debut against FC Utrecht in a 3–0 loss at home.

Karpaty Lviv and Persela Lamongan 
In March 2021, after trialling with AFC Wimbledon in September 2020, Lorenzen signed a one-month contract with Indonesian club Persela Lamongan of the Liga 1.

Sligo Rovers
On 23 August 2021, Lorenzen signed with League of Ireland Premier Division club Sligo Rovers for the remaining 13 games of their 2021 season, following two weeks of training with the club. He left the club at the end of the season.

Wormatia Worms
Free agent Lorenzen joined Wormatia Worms, newly promoted to the Regionalliga Südwest, in September 2022.

International career
Lorenzen was born in London, England to an Ugandan father and a German mother. His surname comes from his mother. His father is called Drake Mugisa. In 2016, he was called up to the Uganda national team, and made his debut in a friendly 2–0 loss to Zimbabwe on 31 May 2016.

Career statistics

References

External links
 
 

1994 births
Living people
German people of Ugandan descent
Footballers from Greater London
Ugandan footballers
Association football wingers
Uganda international footballers
German footballers
Eredivisie players
Bundesliga players
3. Liga players
SV Werder Bremen players
SV Werder Bremen II players
ADO Den Haag players
FC Karpaty Lviv players
Persela Lamongan players
Sligo Rovers F.C. players
Wormatia Worms players
Ukrainian Premier League players
Ugandan expatriate footballers
Ugandan expatriate sportspeople in the Netherlands
Expatriate footballers in the Netherlands
Ugandan expatriate sportspeople in Ukraine
Expatriate footballers in Ukraine
Ugandan expatriate sportspeople in Indonesia
Expatriate footballers in Indonesia
Ugandan expatriate sportspeople in Ireland
Expatriate association footballers in the Republic of Ireland